was a Japanese prosecutor, judge and politician. He was born in Nara Prefecture. He was governor of Ōita Prefecture (1906-1911) and Nagano Prefecture (1911-1913). He was a recipient of the Order of the Sacred Treasure.

References

Bibliography
歴代知事編纂会編『新編日本の歴代知事』歴代知事編纂会、1991年。
内閣「長野県知事正四位勲二等千葉貞幹」大正2年、アジア歴史資料センター レファレンスコード: A10112762300

Governors of Ōita
Governors of Nagano
Japanese judges
Japanese prosecutors
Recipients of the Order of the Sacred Treasure, 4th class
Politicians from Nara Prefecture
1852 births
1913 deaths